The Swiss Federal Patent Court (German: Bundespatentgericht, French: Tribunal fédéral des brevets) is a Swiss federal court competent for particular legal matters, such as patent cases. It has its seat in Sankt Gallen, Switzerland.

In Switzerland, the court has exclusive jurisdiction with regard to the Swiss/Liechtenstein unitary patents, whether these unitary patents are European patents or "national" patents, in questions of validity and infringement disputes, preliminary measures and enforcement of decisions made under its exclusive jurisdiction.

Appeal is possible (with regard to legal issues) to the Federal Supreme Court. The court started its work in 2012, taking over jurisdiction from 26 individual cantonal courts and consists of panels of both legally and technically qualified judges.

See also 
 Federal Patent Court of Germany
 Swiss Federal Institute of Intellectual Property
 Copyright law of Switzerland

References

Further reading

External links

Patent
Swiss patent law
Buildings and structures in St. Gallen (city)
2012 establishments in Switzerland
Courts and tribunals established in 2012